Senator Cogswell may refer to:

Charles A. Cogswell (1844–1908), Oregon State Senate
John B. D. Cogswell (1829–1889), Massachusetts State Senate
William Henry Cogswell (1798–1876), Connecticut State Senate

See also
Amos Coggswell (1825–1892), Minnesota State Senate